Gaziya (Kaitag: Гъазийа) is a rural locality (a selo) in Barshamaysky Selsoviet, Kaytagsky District, Republic of Dagestan, Russia. The population was 388 as of 2010. There are 2 streets.

Geography 
Gaziya is located 6 km southwest of Madzhalis (the district's administrative centre) by road. Khungiya and Mizhigli are the nearest rural localities.

Nationalities 
Dargins live there.

References 

Rural localities in Kaytagsky District